Pletnyov (masculine) or Pletnyova (feminine) is a Russian surname. An alternative spelling is Pletnev. It may refer to the following people:
Andrei Pletnyov (born 1971), Russian football player and referee
Anna Pletnyova (born 1977), Russian singer, composer, songwriter and member of Russian pop-group Vintage
Dmitri Pletnyov (born 1999), Russian footballer
Mikhail Pletnev (born 1957), Russian pianist, conductor and composer
Nina Otkalenko (born Pletnyova, 1928–2015), Russian runner
Pyotr Pletnyov (1792–1866), Russian poet and critic
Svetlana Pletnyova (1926–2008), Russian archaeologist and historian
Valerian Pletnev,  Russian joiner and playwright

Russian-language surnames